The 2000 European Fencing Championships were held in Madeira, Portugal. The event took place from 3 to 9 July 2000 at the Madeira Tecnopolo in Funchal. It gathered competitors from 31 countries.

Medal summary

Men's events

Women's events

Medal table

References 
 Results at the European Fencing Confederation

2000
European Fencing Championships
European Fencing Championships
Sport in Madeira
International fencing competitions hosted by Portugal